Juan Andrés Leiva Nieves (born 11 November 1993) is a Chilean footballer who plays for Ñublense on loan from Universidad Católica as a midfielder.

International career
After being called up to some training microcycles of the Chile senior team, he received his first call-up for the 2022 FIFA World Cup qualifiers against Argentina and Bolivia on 3 and 8 June 2021 respectively, but he didn't make his international debut.

Career statistics

Club

Honours

Club
Universidad de Chile
 Primera División: 2017 Clausura

Universidad Católica
 Primera División: 2021
 Supercopa de Chile: 2020, 2021

References

External links
 

Living people
1993 births
People from Chillán
Chilean footballers
Deportes Concepción (Chile) footballers
Universidad de Chile footballers
Audax Italiano footballers
Unión La Calera footballers
Club Deportivo Universidad Católica footballers
Chilean Primera División players
Primera B de Chile players
Association football midfielders